Hot Curves is a 1930 American pre-Code comedy-drama film produced and distributed by Tiffany Pictures and directed by Norman Taurog. A print is held by the Library of Congress.

Rex Lease, Benny Rubin and Alice Day star. The supporting cast features Pert Kelton.

Plot
Jim Dolan, with a little help from his grandmother, shows the Pittsburgh baseball team what a good pitcher he can be. Jim also becomes involved in romance with Elaine, the manager's daughter, while Maizie, a gold digger, schemes to come between them.

Ballpark vendor Benny, by coincidence, becomes the team's catcher while his quirky sweetheart, Cookie, cheers him on. Jim becomes arrogant, alienates teammates and is even suspended, but snaps out of it in time to save the big game of the World Series.

Cast
Benny Rubin - Benny Goldberg
Rex Lease - Jim Dolan
Alice Day - Elaine McGrew
Pert Kelton - Cookie
John Ince - Mr McGrew, Baseball Team Manager, Elaine's father
Mary Carr - "Grandma Dolan"
Mike Donlin - Baseball Team Scout
Natalie Moorhead - Maizie
Paul Hurst - "Slug" (a baseball player)
Henry Hall - Baseball Team Owner
Marceline Day - Girl
Robert Livingston - a baseball player (billed as Robert Randall)
Greta Granstedt - Girl

References

External links

Hot Curves available for free download at Internet Archive

1930 films
1930 comedy-drama films
Films directed by Norman Taurog
1930s English-language films
American comedy-drama films
American black-and-white films
American baseball films
Tiffany Pictures films
1930 comedy films
1930 drama films
1930s American films